New and Improved may refer to:

 New and Improved (Mice album), 2001
 New and Improved (The Spinners album), 1974